Got Milk? (often stylized as got milk?) is an American advertising campaign encouraging the consumption of milk and dairy products. Created by the advertising agency Goodby Silverstein & Partners for the California Milk Processor Board in 1993, it was later licensed for use by milk processors and dairy farmers. Got Milk? launched in 1993 with the "Aaron Burr" television commercial, directed by Michael Bay. The national campaign, run by MilkPEP (Milk Processor Education Program) added the "got milk?" logo to its "Milk Mustache" ads beginning in 1995.

In January 2014, MilkPEP discontinued its Milk Mustache and "got milk?" advertisements, and launched a new campaign with the tagline "Milk Life." The "got milk?" campaign continues in California and the "got milk?" trademark is being licensed to food and merchandise companies for U.S. and international sales. The campaign has led to increased milk sales in California, although not nationwide.

History

The initial Got Milk? phrase was created by the American advertising agency Goodby Silverstein & Partners. In an interview in Art & Copy, a 2009 documentary that focused on the origins of famous advertising slogans, Jeff Goodby and Rich Silverstein said that the phrase almost didn't turn into an advertising campaign. According to The New York Times, people at Goodby Silverstein "thought it was lazy, not to mention grammatically incorrect".

The advertisements would typically feature people in various situations involving dry or sticky foods and treats such as cakes and cookies. The people then would find themselves in an uncomfortable situation due to a full mouth and no milk to wash it down, including a commercial of a cruel businessman getting hit by a truck seconds after insulting someone over the phone and seemingly going to Heaven, only to find out it is actually Hell where he finds a huge plate of cookies and an endless supply of completely empty milk cartons, as well as a commercial of an airplane pilot intentionally putting his plane into a dangerously steep nosedive in order to obtain a bottle of milk from a flight attendant's cart out of his reach, only for the cart to crash into a man who gets out of the bathroom right in front of the cart. At the end of the commercial, the character would look directly to the camera sadly and then boldly displayed would be the words "Got Milk?" The print advertisements would feature food such as a sandwich, cookies, or cupcakes with a bite taken out of them or cats and children demanding milk.

The first Got Milk? advertisement aired nationwide on October 29, 1993, which featured a historian (played by Sean Whalen) receiving a call to answer a radio station's $10,000 trivia question (voiced by Rob Paulsen), "Who shot Alexander Hamilton in that famous duel?" (referring to the Burr–Hamilton duel). The man is shown to have an entire museum solely for the duel itself, packed with all the artifacts. He answers the question correctly by saying "Aaron Burr", but because his mouth is full of peanut butter sandwich and he does not have milk to wash it down, his answer is unintelligible. The DJ promptly hangs up on him. The ad, directed by Michael Bay, was at the top of the advertising industry's award circuit in 1994. In 2002, the ad was named one of the ten best commercials of all time by a USA Today poll and was run again nationwide that same year.

The slogan "Got Milk?" was licensed to the National Milk Processor Education Program (MilkPEP) in 1995 to use on their print ads, which, since then, have included celebrities like Britney Spears, Beyoncé, Rihanna, Serena Williams and Venus Williams, as well as fictional characters from TV, video games, and films such as the Avengers, The Simpsons, Batman, Mario, and The Powerpuff Girls posing in print advertisements sporting a "milk mustache" and employing the slogan, "Where's your mustache?" The milk mustache campaign was created by art director Bernie Hogya and copywriter Jennifer Gold. The milk mustache campaign promoting the Super Bowl has also been featured in USA Today; the Friday edition featured one player from each Super Bowl team to the player from the winning team in Monday's edition. It was not featured in 2014 as the advertising focus that year was on the "Protein Fight Club" campaign which promoted the importance of eating breakfast with milk and the "Refuel: Got Chocolate Milk" campaign.

Former California Governor Gray Davis expressed his dislike for one commercial and asked if there was a way to remove it from the air. It featured two children who refuse to drink milk, because they believe milk is for babies. They tell their mother that their elderly next-door neighbor, Mr. Miller, never drinks milk. They see him going to use his wheelbarrow when suddenly his arms rip off because, having not consumed milk, his bones are weak and fragile. The children scream in horror and then frighteningly start imbibing every last drop of milk they have.

From 1994 to 2005, ads appeared in California directed at Hispanic consumers, using the tagline "Familia, Amor y Leche" ("Family, Love and Milk"), created by Anita Santiago Advertising. In 2005, the Spanish-language campaign was awarded to ad agency Grupo Gallegos, who changed the tagline to “toma leche” or “drink milk”.

According to the Got Milk? website, the campaign has over 90% awareness in the United States, and the tagline has been licensed to dairy boards across the nation since 1995. Got Milk? is a powerful property and has been licensed on a range of consumer goods, including Barbie dolls, Hot Wheels, baby and teen apparel, and kitchenware. The trademarked line has been widely parodied by groups championing a variety of causes. Many of these parodies use a lookalike rather than the actual persons used in the original Got Milk? advertisements. In 2005, the California Milk Processor Board created a "Got Ripped Off?" poster showcasing their top 100 favorite parodies of the slogan.

The voice saying "Got Milk?" in most of the nationwide television commercials is that of American voiceover actor Denny Delk. Other narrators have occasionally been used.

In February 2014, MilkPEP announced that it would discontinue licensing the slogan for its advertising in favor of a new tagline named "Milk Life". Despite this, the California Milk Processor Board (the creators and owners of the trademark) continue to use it. As of 2016, the brand is used for a line of snack foods called Got Milk Snacks.

In 2020, MilkPEP revived the campaign in light of increased sales during the COVID-19 pandemic.

Parodies and references

The slogan is a snowclone, having appeared in numerous alternative versions on T-shirts and other advertisements. By 2007, the slogan had become an international icon, and the phrase has been parodied more than any other ad slogan.
 In the Friends episode "The One with the Mugging", Monica points out that Ross was not the originator of the "Got Milk?" advertisement.
 In the Johnny Bravo episode "Cookie Crisis", when Johnny realizes that he accidentally bought a million and two boxes of cookies, he turns over to the viewer and asks "Got milk?"
 The Sonic Adventure 2 level Radical Highway features a blimp in the level that reads "got ring?"; this Easter egg was carried over into the Nintendo 3DS version of Sonic Generations, which also features Radical Highway.
 For the most part, the California Milk Processor Board has ignored the alternative uses, although in 2007 it threatened lawsuit against PETA for their anti-dairy campaign "Got Pus?", which began in 2002.
 GottMik, drag queen as seen on Ru Paul’s Drag Race season 13
 In 2002, a Washington state resident applied for a vanity plate reading "GOTMILF". This plate was approved, but was later canceled after complaints were filed against it.
 In 2004, the slogan was imitated by artist David Rosen, with the popular political design "Got Democracy?", in reaction to the Iraq War.
 In Garfield: The Movie, Garfield asked the question "Got Milk?" after drinking a whole bottle of milk.
 In the 2000 film Nutty Professor II: The Klumps, after Buddy Love unknowingly consumes a formula made by Sherman Klump and age regresses into an infantile state, he tries to escape and lands in a female secretary's breasts (played by February 1998 Playboy Playmate Julia Schultz). While looking at her breast cleavage he quotes the phrase "got milk".
 In the Daria episode "Psycho Therapy", Jake Morgendorffer, when his efforts to get a glass of milk are thwarted by his wife Helen, roars, "Got milk? Not Jakey! Dammit!"
 In the Season 1 episode "It's Hokey Mon!" of The Grim Adventures of Billy and Mandy, Mandy creates her own monster that turns the other monsters into toast; at the end of the episode, Mandy's monster is eating toast in bed and asks her, "Got milk?"
 In the Rick and Morty episode "M. Night Shaym-Aliens!", Jerry Smith pitches an advertising campaign "Hungry for apples?", inspired by "Got Milk?", which gets him fired.
 In 2015, the YouTube page for the musical Hamilton uploaded a parody of the "Who shot Alexander Hamilton?" advert in which the man eating a peanut butter sandwich is played by Leslie Odom Jr., who played Aaron Burr in the original Broadway cast of the show. The video ends with the classic slogan on a black screen, parodied to read "got hamilton?"
 In 2016, singer Fergie released the music video for her song "M.I.L.F. $" which includes various models parodying the Got Milk advertisements, but instead with "got milf?"

See also
 Got Rice?

References

Further reading

External links
  gotmilk.com
  tomaleche.com

American advertising slogans
Advertising campaigns
Dairy farming in the United States
Snowclones
Milk in culture
1993 neologisms
1993 establishments in the United States
Dairy marketing